Masayuki Suzuki may refer to:

Musicians
Masayuki Suzuki, singer
Masayuki Suzuki (drummer)

Film and TV
Masayuki Suzuki (director), stage director of Beautiful Life (Japanese TV series)
Masayuki Suzuki (actor) from The Space Sheriff Spirits
Masayuki Suzuki (film director) for Hero (2015 Japanese film)